82nd parallel may refer to:

82nd parallel north, a circle of latitude in the Northern Hemisphere
82nd parallel south, a circle of latitude in the Southern Hemisphere, in Antarctica